Schlingel (Usually written: SCHLINGEL) is an international film festival for children and young audiences. The festival began in 1996, and has taken place annually in Chemnitz ever since in the week before the Saxon Fall Break. The festival gives an overview of the newest international productions in the area of children and youth films. The festival is organized by the Saxon Children and Youth Films Association in Chemnitz. In addition, since 2006, the Saxon Institution for Private Broadcasting and New Media has also helped to organize this event. The patrons of SCHLINGEL are the Prime Minister of the Free State of Saxony, as well as the Mayor of Chemnitz. The festival is under the directorate of Michael Harbauer.

Development 
The foundation for the present day International Film Festival for Children and Young Audiences SCHLINGEL was laid in 1996 with the first Chemnitz Children's Film Exhibition SCHLINGEL. This first festival ran for one week in the Chemnitz Culture Centre "Kraftwerk" and showed films for children aged 5 – 14. In 1998 the venue was changed to the CineStar Luxor-Filmpalast, where it still occurs today. The first award ceremony emerged in 2000 with the prizes being awarded based on public opinion. That year the award went to  Tomás und der König der Falken ["Thomas and the King of the Falcons"] by Václav Vorlíček.

The first competition category, the International Children's Film Competition, was created in 2001. Today, the ever increasing number of applicants for this category confirms its importance among the SCHLINGEL awards. Also in 2001, the first monetary prize was given in this category from the city of Chemnitz – 10,000 DM to the best children's film. This prize went to the Italian film Iris by director Aurelio Grimaldi.

In 2003 came, for the first time, an appeal for a European Children's Jury. Within the International Children's Film Competition, children of different European nationalities (i.e. from Denmark, France, Greece, Poland, the Czech Republic and Hungary) gave the "Europäischen Kinderfilmpreis" (European Children's Film Prize). The Saxon State Minister for Science and Art donated €5,000 to be awarded as the prize in this category.

In 2002 SCHLINGEL opened the International Youth Film Competition in conjunction with the Children's Film Competition, for those older than 14 years. This separation from the classic children's film category enabled the opportunity for particular consideration of the different points of view and interests between children and youth. This was the sole separation until 2007 when it was decided that, as past experience showed, this single differentiation did not do justice to the varied adolescent generation.

An increase in film production in the age range of 11 – 13, as well as a resultant increase in public attention, created a public worry that films for children were under threat and these films were difficult to place in the distribution world. In order to prevent this development from happening, in 2007 SCHLINGEL created the International Junior Film Competition, which aimed to appeal directly to 11 – 13 year olds.

The Competition 
The categories of the festival are:
 S – Children's Film Competition (up to 10 years old)
 M – Junior Film Competition (11 to 13 years old)
 L – Youth Film Competition (over 14 years old)
 XS – Short and Animated Film Competition (up to 13 years old)
 D – Focal Point - Germany
 P – Panorama

Every year the range of competitions is accompanied by an extensive companion program. In conjunction with discourse with the film honorarium in attendance, there are seminars, discussion groups for visitors, as well as workshops for school groups and kindergarten classes. This type of continuous strong integration of east-European productions in the geo-political sense sharpens the profile of the competition.

Awards and Winners

Jury awards
Eleven juries give awards with a total value of approximately 64,000 euros.

 European Children's Film Award by the Saxon Ministry of Culture
 SLM Top Award
 Award of the City of Chemnitz
 MDR Special Award
 DIAMANT - Award of the best Child Actor
 Junior Film Award
 Youth Film Award
 DEFA Foundation Award
 Youth and Children's Film Award of the Goethe Institute
 Animated Feature Film Award
 Short Film Award National
 Short Film Award International
 Animated Short Film Award National
 Animated Short Film Award International

Cross-Competition Awards:

 Award of the European Children's Film Association ECFA
 Award of the FIPRESCI Jury
 Award of the Ecumenical Jury
 Lichtenauer Audience Award

Other

SCHLINGEL Awards of Distinction
 2006: Director Václav Vorlíček
 2007: Defa-Director Rolf Losansky
 2008: Producer Uschi Reich
 2009: Christa und Hans Strobel, Editor of KJK
 2010: Zdeněk Miler, Animator and Illustrator of the Mole
 2011: Director, screenwriter and actor Günter Meyer
 2012: Gojko Mitić, Actor
 2013: , Director and producer, e.g. of The Little Polar Bear
 2014: Arend Agthe, Director and producer, e.g. of Flussfahrt mit Huhn ("Hen in a Boat")
 2015: Gert Kaspar Müntefering, Creator of Die Sendung mit der Maus

External links 
 Official Website of SCHLINGEL
 Media Service Saxony
 The Office of the Saxon Prime Minister
 City of Chemnitz
 DEFA-Foundation
 BJF
 ECFA

References 
 https://web.archive.org/web/20100212080455/http://ff-schlingel.de/preise_und_jurys.html
 http://www.kinderfilmdienst.de/index.htm
 http://www.cifej.com/en/panoramaDetails.php?festId=2985
 http://www.contestwatchers.com/schlingel-15th-international-film-festival-for-children-and-young-audience/
 http://www.kinderfilm-online.de/festivals/schlingel

Film festivals in Germany
Culture in Chemnitz
Children's film festivals